WQDT-LD, virtual channel 33 (UHF digital channel 32), is a low-powered Buzzr-affiliated television station licensed to New Orleans, Louisiana, United States. The station is owned by DTV America Corporation.

The station transmits its digital signal from a tower located along U.S. 90 near Westwego.

History 
Originally licensed to Lumberton, Mississippi, in the Hattiesburg media market, the station's construction permit was issued in August 2012 under the callsign of W33DT-D. The current WQDT-LD call letters were adopted on April 1, 2016. More than five months later, the station went on the air, first with Infomercials from Revenue Frontier, then became a Buzzr affiliate in October. Six additional subchannels were launched days thereafter.

Sometime before the station signed on, DTV America decided to move WQDT to the New Orleans area. The station identification placard presently in use on the air mentions New Orleans even though the city of license officially remains to be Lumberton, Mississippi.

Digital channels
The station's signal is multiplexed:

References

External links

DTV America
Buzzr

Buzzr affiliates
GetTV affiliates
Stadium (sports network) affiliates
Low-power television stations in the United States
Innovate Corp.
QDT-LD
Television channels and stations established in 2016